Georgios Zygogiannis (born 5 August 1994) is a Greek footballer who plays for Panelefsiniakos as defender.

Career
On August 7, 2013, Zygogiannis agreed to sign contract with AEK Larnaca in Cyprus.

References

External links
 
 
 

1994 births
Living people
Panionios F.C. players
AEK Larnaca FC players
Greek expatriate footballers
Expatriate footballers in Cyprus
Panelefsiniakos F.C. players
Footballers from Athens
Greek footballers
Association football defenders